Meropi is a village and a community in the municipality of Oichalia, in Messenia, Greece. It is located in the plains of northern Messenia, west of the Taygetus mountains. It is near a major highway linking Kalamata and Corinth, the Greek National Road 7. It is 1.5 km south of Oichalia, 3.5 km northeast of Meligalas, 21 km southwest of Megalopoli and 26 km north of Kalamata. In 2011 its population was 485 for the village, and 603 for the community, which consists of the villages Meropi, Allagi (pop. 97) and Mousta (pop. 21).

The community has a small school, a church, a restaurant, a post office and a square. Farm lands surround the villages. Olive groves are common in the west and north.

See also
List of settlements in Messenia

References

External links
GTP - Meropi

Populated places in Messenia